Stefanie Ann Sargent (June 1, 1968 – June 27, 1992) was an American musician. She was the lead guitarist and co-founder of Seattle punk rock band 7 Year Bitch.

Biography

Sargent was born to Paula and Kenneth Sargent on June 1, 1968, in Seattle, Washington, where she was raised. She attended Roosevelt High School, then transferred to the Summit K-12 Alternative School, and graduated at age 16.

After leaving high school, Sargent worked various jobs and traveled across the West Coast. She had been a member of several bands by 1990, when she co-founded 7 Year Bitch alongside Selene Vigil, Valerie Agnew and Elizabeth Davis. She played guitar on the band's debut record, Sick 'Em (1992).

Death

Sargent was found dead in her Capitol Hill apartment on June 28, 1992. After consuming alcohol and using heroin at a party, she returned home and passed out on her back. She died of asphyxiation after vomiting, having failed to wake up.

Discography

Albums
Sick 'Em (C/Z Records, 1992).

Other contributions
 "8-Ball Deluxe" on Kill Rock Stars (Kill Rock Stars, Nov '12).
 "Dead Men Don't Rape" on There's A Dyke in the Pit (Outpunk/Harp Records, 1992).

References

1968 births
1992 deaths
American rock guitarists
Feminist musicians
Musicians from Seattle
20th-century American guitarists
Guitarists from Washington (state)
7 Year Bitch members
Alcohol-related deaths in Washington
Drug-related deaths in Washington (state)
20th-century American women guitarists